NLH may refer to:

 Norwegian University of Life Sciences, a public university located in Ås, Norway
 NLH, IATA code for Ninglang Luguhu Airport, in Yunnan Province, China
 New Literary History, an American academic journal
 National Library for Health, proposed reform of the National electronic Library for Health in Britain
 No-Limit Hold 'em, a variant of Texas hold 'em poker
 Norwegian Long Haul (ICAO: NLH), a low-cost long-haul airline